Ulla Lighthouse is a lighthouse just off the north end of the island of Haramsøya in Ålesund Municipality, Møre og Romsdal county, Norway.

In October 1944, the lighthouse and the surrounding buildings were attacked by allied airplanes. The lighthouse was badly destroyed, and not rebuilt until after the war in 1950.

The lighthouse is still in operation, and is protected by the Norwegian government as an historical landmark. The Norwegian Coastal Administration owns the surrounding buildings, and the old station is available for hire.

References

External links
Ulla fyr
 Norsk Fyrhistorisk Forening 
 Picture of Ulla Lighthouse  leuchtturmseiten.de

Lighthouses completed in 1874
Lighthouses in Møre og Romsdal
Ålesund